Homeobox protein MSX-2 is a protein that in humans is encoded by the MSX2 gene.

Function 

This gene encodes a member of the muscle segment homeobox gene family. The encoded protein is a transcriptional repressor whose normal activity may establish a balance between survival and apoptosis of neural crest-derived cells required for proper craniofacial morphogenesis. The encoded protein may also have a role in promoting cell growth under certain conditions and may be an important target for the RAS signaling pathways. Mutations in this gene are associated with parietal foramina 1 and craniosynostosis type 2.
Msx2 is a homeobox gene localized on human chromosome 5 that encodes a transcription repressor and activator (MSX-2) responsible for craniofacial and limb-bud development. Cells will express msx2 when exposed to signaling molecules BMP-2 and BMP-4 in situ. Expression of msx2 leads to the proliferation, migration and osteogenic differentiation of neural crest cells during embryogenesis and bone fracture. It is well documented that expression of cell-cell adhesion molecules such as E-cadherins will promote structural integrity and an epithelial arrangement of cells, while expression of N-cadherin and vimentin promote mesenchymal arrangement and cell migration. Msx2 downregulates E-cadherins and upregulates N-cadherin and vimentin which indicates its role in inducing epithelial mesenchymal transition (EMT). Germline knockout mice have been created for this gene (Msx2 +/-) in order to examine functional loss. Clinical studies on craniosynostosis, or the premature fusion of cranial structures,  have shown the condition to be genetically linked to mutation in the msx2 homeobox gene.

Interactions 

Msh homeobox 2 has been shown to interact with DLX5, DLX2 and MSX1.

References

Further reading

External links 
  GeneReviews/NCBI/UW/NIH entry on Enlarged Parietal Foramina/Cranium Bifidum 
 
 
 

Transcription factors
Human proteins